All India Marwari Yuva Manch (AIMYM) is one of the largest volunteer organisations of youth in India. Its primary goal is to support young people in contributing to their community and country. The AIMYM focuses on providing accessibility of assertive devices (e.g., prosthetic limbs and rehabilitative aids to the disabled.

Membership is open to men and women between the ages of 18 and 40, who must have adopted the lifestyle, language and culture of Rajasthan, Haryana, Malwa in Madhya Pradesh or nearby regions. They or their forefathers must identify themselves as Marwari. The first branch of the Marwari Yuva Manch opened on 10 October 1977 in Guwahati. The organization has since grown over 750 branches across both inside and outside of India, comprising almost 55,000 members.

Public utility projects 

 Ambulance service
 Blood donation service
 Cancer Detection
 Clean India Campaign
 Moksh Rath (Mortuary Van)

Project highlights 

AIMYM projects include:

  Calipers and artificial limbs – more than 1,00,000 limbs provided
  Ambulance services – Approximately 300 ambulances services running across the country
  Movement to Protect Girls – intensive campaign in Rajasthan and across India
  Clean Water Project, amrit dhara – Approximately 5,000 coolers and pyaus installed

Disability in India 

Most of the disabled people living in India are isolated and poor. Their disability, combined with poverty and lack of education, deny them access to rehabilitation services. The AIMYM developed an appropriate, simple, informal and humane camp approach under which artificial limbs, calipers, and other aids are provided easily and free of cost at the camp site. The AIMYM organizes a large number of camps every year in various parts of the country where artificial limbs, (Jaipur prostheses), polio calipers, etc. are produced and provided on the spot.

Cancer Detection 
The very dangerous disease that is eating up the whole world is Cancer. So, in such a situation Marwari Yuva Manch has come up with the Mobile Cancer Van which is rendering free services all over the country going from one place to another. The highly technically advanced machines and equipments checks the malign advent of cancer and provide the public with a scope to cure it by taking immediate action.

Clean India campaign 

Marwari Yuva Manch joined the nation in Swachh Bharat Abhiyan. On 11 January 2015 around 1,11,111 volunteers joined the campaign across the nation.

Incumbency Of President

State presidents

References

External links 
 AIMYM website
 Odisha Tourism
 
 UPMYM FB Page
 UPMYM Facebook Group
 UPMYM Twitter Page
 MYM Bangalore website

Youth organisations based in India
Marwari people
Organizations established in 1977
Disability organisations based in India
Ambulance services in India
1977 establishments in India